The Hitmen were an English new wave band formed in 1979. They released seven singles and two albums on the Columbia label. Members of the band would later go on to have successful careers in other notable bands and in music production.

History
The band were formed in 1979 and consisted of members Ben Watkins (vocals, guitar), Pete Glenister (guitar), Stan Shaw (keyboards), Neil Brockbank (bass) and Mike Gaffey (drums). Shaw and Brockbank were later replaced by Alan Wilder and John Jay (of Ian Mitchell Band), respectively.

In Australia, the band were known as The London Hitmen due to a naming conflict with the local band of the same name.

The band released two studio albums; Aim for the Feet in 1980 and Torn Together in 1981. The 1981 single "Bates Motel" became a minor hit, being played widely on UK radio and having its video featured on the newly-launched MTV channel in the United States.

After The Hitmen
Ben Watkins went on to join Brilliant then later form the electronic bands the Flowerpot Men and Juno Reactor, as well as working with Killing Joke's Martin 'Youth' Glover in the duo The Empty Quarter.

Pete Glenister went on to play guitar, write and produce for other artists such as Kirsty MacColl, Alison Moyet, Terence Trent D'Arby, Anni-Frid Lyngstad, Bruce Foxton, Fischer-Z and Bryan Ferry, among many others.

Alan Wilder became the keyboardist for Depeche Mode in 1982 then continued his solo project Recoil after leaving the band in 1995.

Neil Brockbank became an audio engineer and producer for many artists including Nick Lowe, Mary Coughlan, Alison Moyet, Tanita Tikaram, Bryan Ferry and Ocean Colour Scene. He died in 2017 of cancer.

Discography

Albums
Aim for the Feet (1980), Columbia/Urgent
Torn Together (1981), Columbia

Singles
"Hold On to Her" (1980)
"I Still Remember It" (1980)
"She's All Mine" (1980)
"O.K." (1980)
"Bates Motel" (1981)
"Ouija" (1981)
"Bad Timing" (1981)

References

External links

English new wave musical groups
Musical groups established in 1979
Musical groups disestablished in 1982
Musical groups from London
Columbia Records artists
Epic Records artists